Seyyed Kola or Seyyed Kala or Seyd Kola may refer to:
 Seyyed Kola, Babol Kenar, Babol County
 Seyyed Kola, Gatab, Babol County
 Bala Seyyed Kola, Gatab District, Babol County
 Pain Seyyed Kola, Gatab District, Babol County
 Seyyed Kola, Juybar
 Seyyed Kola, Nur